Lorenz von Bibra, Duke in Franconia (1459, Mellrichstadt – 6 February 1519, Würzburg) was Prince-Bishop of the Bishopric of Würzburg from 1495 to 1519. His life paralleled that of Maximilian I (1459–1519), who ruled the Holy Roman Empire from 1493 to 1519, whom Lorenz served as an advisor.

Born in 1459, he attended school at Vessra Abbey and university at Heidelberg, Erfurt, and Paris. In 1487 he wrote a letter of introduction to Pope Innocent VIII for his half brother Wilhelm who was being sent to the Vatican as emissary of Archbishop Hermann IV of Cologne. In 1490, Wilhelm became ill and died when returning from Rome as an emissary of Frederick III, Holy Roman Emperor. The grave of Wilhelm von Bibra is still to be seen in the Pelligrini Chapel of the Santa Anastasia Church in Verona.

Lorenz was a popular and well respected ruler. He was often called upon to serve as an arbitrator to solve disputes. An adherent of the German humanism movement of the late 15th and early 16th centuries and renaissance man, he sought to bring reforms to the Catholic Church from within.

Lorenz von Bibra and Martin Luther

Meeting with Luther and letter to Frederick the Wise
Lorenz met with and got along well with Martin Luther.  Luther arrived on April 18, 1518 in Würzburg with a letter of introduction from Duke Frederick the Wise of Saxony.  Lorenz offered a new escort accompany him to Heidelberg Disputation.  Luther turned down the offer  as Luther’s Erfut brethren, Land and Usingen, met him and offered a ride on their cart.  This was right before Luther's disputes with the Catholic Church heated up and right before Lorenz died in 1519. Following the meeting in Würzburg, Lorenz wrote a letter of recommendation to Duke Frederick the Wise of Saxony stating:

George Spalatin wrote:

Speculation by historians, what if Lorenz had lived longer
Frederick the Wise was the second most powerful man in the Holy Roman Empire and became Luther's greatest protector and champion during the Reformation. This letter has helped fuel speculation over Lorenz's sympathies. Baier reports that the historians von Seckendorff, Lingke, Strobel, Walch, Engelhardt, Vierort, Tentzel, Löhe, Shornbaum and Köstlin (in contrast to Scharold) agreed with Splatin that had Lorenz lived longer, the Episcopate of Würzburg would have gone over to the Protestants.

Baier quotes Splatin:

Luther’s comments on Lorenz’ views on monasteries and convents
Bair quotes also quotes Splatin:

An incident that occurred while Luther traveled through Würzburg was later commented on by Luther.  Some young Domherren (members of the cathedral chapter) took part in a terrible fight among themselves whereby one of them lost his hand.  Lorenz “jailed” them in a monastery.  Luther later commented:

Pilgrimages to Grimmenthal
A chapel at Grimmenthal was erected by a  Würzburg Captain which was dedicated by the Suffragan bishop of Lorenz, Georg von Bipolis, on August 24, 1498.  The number of pilgrims grew so much and the money came in so abundantly that a bigger church had to be built by the chapel which was inaugurated on May 1, 1502.  Luther had nothing nice to say about this:

Present day influences
The exchange between Luther and Lorenz was the inspiration of a short two scene play, Luther bei Lorenz von Bibra, by Deacon Dr. Günter Breitenbach of the Evangelical Church in Germany, in September 2007 and performed October 2, 2007 at the Augustinerkirche in Würzburg with Dr. Breitenbach in the role of Lorenz von Bibra and Catholic Augustinian Provinzprokurator Br. Peter Reinl OSA in the role of Luther.

Bishop Lorenz is also used as an important character in the 2010 historical novel Die Königin der Gaukler (Queen of the Jugglers) by Guido Dieckmann.

Lorenz von Bibra and Riemenschneider 
Contrary to his successor, Lorenz also had good relations with the famous sculptor Tilman Riemenschneider who at a time also served as mayor of Würzburg. Lorenz commissioned him to make an altar for the new church in Bibra.   Lorenz also commissioned Riemenschneider to do both his predecessor's, Rudolf von Scherenberg, and his own grave marker in the cathedral in Würzburg. Today, the two gravestones stand side by side, same stone and motif, but in two different styles, late gothic and renaissance.

Lorenz von Bibra and Trithemius 
Johannes Trithemius (1 February 1462 - 13 December 1516) in 1506 decided to take up the offer of Lorenz von Bibra to become abbot of the St. Jakob zu den Schotten, the Schottenklöster ("Scottish monastery") in Würzburg. The word steganography is taken from his book Steganographia, a treatise on cryptography and steganography disguised as a book on black magic and his book Polygraphia (1518) was the first printed book on cryptography.

 von Bibra Family 

It has been noted that Lorenz appointed a very large number of his Bibra relatives to government positions in the Bishopric of Würzburg and that his successor, Konrad II von Thungen, also followed this same pattern but to an even greater degree.

Lorenz was a member of the aristocratic Franconian von Bibra family which among its members were Lorenz’ half brother, Wilhelm von Bibra Papal emissary, Conrad von Bibra, Prince-Bishop of Würzburg, Duke in Franconia (1490–1544), Heinrich von Bibra, Prince-Bishop, Prince-Abbot of Fulda (1711–1788) and Ernst von Bibra (1806–1878), naturalist and author.

 References 
 Enno Bünz, Wolfgang Weiß (Hrsg.): Bischof Lorenz von Bibra (1495–1519) und seine Zeit – Herrschaft, Kirche und Kultur im Umbruch. Echter, Würzburg 2020, .
DR. JOHANNES BAIER,  Dr. Martin Luther’s Aufenthalt in Würzburg, 1895, Chapter 5  Bischof Lorenz von Bibra und Dr. Martin Luther. VERLAG UND DRUCK DER STAHEL’SCHEN K. HOF- UND UNIVERSITÄTS- BUCH- UND KUNSTHANDLUNG;
MARTIN BRECHT, Martin Luther: His Road to Reformation 1483-1521 Translated by James L. Schaaf,  Fortress Press, 1993 , ;
WILHELM FRHR. VON BIBRA, Geschichte der Familie der Freiherrn von Bibra, 1870;
WILHELM FRHR. VON BIBRA, Beiträge zur Familien Geschichte der Reichsfreiherrn von Bibra, Zweiter Band (vol. 2), 1882;
JULIEN CHAPUIS, Tilman Riemenschneider: Master Sculptor of the Late Middle Ages, National Gallery London Publications, October 11, 1999,     ;
WERNER WAGENHÖFER, Die Bibra: Studien und Materialien zur Genealogie und zur Besitzgeschichte einer fränkischen Niederadelsfamilie im Spätmittelalter, Verlag Degener & Co, 1998, 699 pages, ;
ALFRED WENDEHORST, Das Bistum Würzburg: Teil 3. Die Bischofsreihe von 1455 -1617, 1978, pp. 51–72;
ALFRED WENDEHORST, Lorenz von Bibra. In: Neue Deutsche Biographie'' (NDB). Vol. 15, Duncker & Humblot, Berlin 1987, P. 169.

External links
Lorenz von Bibra page on vonbibra.net
Link to Biography (German)
Link to 2nd Biography (German)

1459 births
1519 deaths
15th-century Roman Catholic bishops in Bavaria
16th-century Roman Catholic bishops in Bavaria
Dukes of Germany
Prince-Bishops of Würzburg
Lorenz
German Renaissance humanists
Heidelberg University alumni
University of Erfurt alumni
University of Paris alumni
Burials at Würzburg Cathedral
Dukes of Franconia
Sculptures by Tilman Riemenschneider
German expatriates in France